Kiskunmajsa is a district in eastern part of Bács-Kiskun County. Kiskunmajsa is also the name of the town where the district seat is found. The district is located in the Southern Great Plain Statistical Region.

Geography 
Kiskunmajsa District borders with Kiskunfélegyháza District to the north, Kistelek District (Csongrád County) to the east, Mórahalom District (Csongrád County) to the south, Kiskunhalas District and Kiskőrös District to the west. The number of the inhabited places in Kiskunmajsa District is 6.

Municipalities 
The district has 1 town and 5 villages.
(ordered by population, as of 1 January 2012)

The bolded municipality is a city.

Demographics

In 2011, it had a population of 18,908 and the population density was 39/km².

Ethnicity
Besides the Hungarian majority, the main minorities are the Roma (approx. 800) and German (200).

Total population (2011 census): 18,908
Ethnic groups (2011 census): Identified themselves: 18,558 persons:
Hungarians: 17,271 (93.06%)
Gypsies: 829 (4.47%)
Germans: 213 (1.15%)
Others and indefinable: 245 (1.32%)
Approx. 500 persons in Kiskunmajsa District did not declare their ethnic group at the 2011 census.

Religion
Religious adherence in the county according to 2011 census:

Catholic – 13,135 (Roman Catholic – 13,116; Greek Catholic – 14);
Reformed – 639;
Evangelical – 74;
other religions – 259; 
Non-religious – 1,395; 
Atheism – 52;
Undeclared – 3,354.

Gallery

See also
List of cities and towns of Hungary

References

External links
 Postal codes of the Kiskunmajsa District

Districts in Bács-Kiskun County